Haunted Hollow is a turn-based strategy game, developed by Firaxis Games and published by 2K Games for iOS. It originally briefly made its appearance on April 23, 2013, before it was pulled from the iOS App Store. 2K Games commented in a statement: "Some of our fans may have noticed our latest mobile title, Haunted Hollow, pre-maturely appearing on the App Store this morning as a result of a testing error. We have removed this build to add a few final updates, so the game can be as polished as possible when it launches globally. But fans won't have to wait long – Haunted Hollow will be available for free to download from the App Store next Thursday, May 2, 2013!"

Reception

The game received above-average reviews according to the review aggregation website Metacritic.

References

External links
 

2013 video games
2K games
Firaxis Games games
IOS games
IOS-only games
Turn-based strategy video games
Video games developed in the United States